Andarsoy (Russian and Tajik: Андарсой) is a village in Sughd Region, northern Tajikistan. It is part of the jamoat Tursun Uljaboev (formerly: Nov) in Spitamen District.

References

Populated places in Sughd Region